Nēnēs (ネーネーズ) is an Okinawan folk music group formed in 1990 by China Sadao (知名定男). The group name means "sisters" in Okinawan. Nēnēs is composed of four female singers who perform traditional Okinawan folk songs in traditional costume with sanshin accompaniment; they have also performed with a backing band, Sadao China Gakudan. They toured Europe and played New York City in 1994. An independent release, IKAWŪ, landed them a recording contract with Sony Records and a collaboration with Ryuichi Sakamoto. They hold a resident gig at the Live House Shima-Uta club in Naha, Okinawa.

Members

Discography

Nēnēs also sang in the title track of Talvin Singh's Ok album.

References

Bibliography
 Henry Johnson, Nenes’ Koza Dabasa: Okinawa in the World Music Market. London: Bloomsbury Academic. (2021)

External links
 Nēnēs Discography 
 Nēnēs Profile 
 Live House Shima-Uta Nenes news and performance schedule 

Japanese pop music groups
Musical groups from Okinawa Prefecture
Musical groups established in 1990
1990 establishments in Japan